The 2018–19 Quaid-e-Azam One Day Cup was the first edition of the Quaid-e-Azam One Day Cup, a List A cricket tournament that took place in Pakistan from 6 September to 4 November 2018. Each match was played after the conclusion of the corresponding first-class fixture in the 2018–19 Quaid-e-Azam Trophy.

Following the conclusion of the group stage, National Bank of Pakistan, Khan Research Laboratories, Habib Bank Limited and Islamabad from Pool A along with Sui Southern Gas Corporation, Pakistan Television, Water and Power Development Authority and Multan from Pool B had all qualified for the quarter-finals.

In the first quarter-final match, Water and Power Development Authority beat National Bank of Pakistan by eight wickets. In the second quarter-final, Habib Bank Limited beat Sui Southern Gas Company by 166 runs, with Jamal Anwar scoring a century. The third quarter-final saw Khan Research Laboratories beat Multan by six wickets. In the last quarter-final match, Pakistan Television beat Islamabad by nine runs, with Mohammad Waqas and Hasan Mohsin both scoring centuries.

The first semi-final match saw Water and Power Development Authority beat Khan Research Laboratories by five wickets to advance to the final. In the second semi-final, Habib Bank Limited beat Pakistan Television by seven runs. In the final Habib Bank Limited beat Water and Power Development Authority by 62 runs to win the tournament.

Teams
The following teams competed in the 2018–19 tournament:

Regional
 Federally Administered Tribal Areas
 Islamabad
 Karachi Whites
 Lahore Blues
 Lahore Whites
 Multan
 Peshawar
 Rawalpindi

Department
 Habib Bank Limited
 Khan Research Laboratories
 National Bank of Pakistan
 Pakistan Television
 Sui Northern Gas Pipelines Limited
 Sui Southern Gas Company
 Water and Power Development Authority
 Zarai Taraqiati Bank Limited

Points table

Pool A

 Team qualified for the Knockout stage

Pool B

 Team qualified for the Knockout stage

Group stage

Pool A

Round 1

Round 2

Round 3

Round 4

Round 5

Round 6

Round 7

Pool B

Round 1

Round 2

Round 3

Round 4

Round 5

Round 6

Round 7

Knockout stage

Quarter-finals

Semi-finals and final

References

External links
 Series home at ESPN Cricinfo

Quaid-e-Azam One Day Cup
Quaid-e-Azam One Day Cup